W. S. Sasi is an Indian politician and leader of Communist Party of India (CPI). He represented Mala constituency in 10th Kerala Legislative Assembly elected in 1996 By-election.

References

Communist Party of India politicians from Kerala